Moderna Museet Malmö is a museum of modern and contemporary art located in Malmö, Sweden. It is a part of the state-owned Moderna Museet but has an independent exhibition programme. The museum was opened in December 2009.

The main building of the museum originally held an electricity plant established in 1901. It was later transformed into an exhibition hall which housed the Rooseum Centre for Contemporary art between 1988 and 2006. Before Moderna Museet Malmö moved in, the interior was transformed again and a new annex was built.

References

External links

 Moderna Museet Malmö - Official site (in Swedish and English)

Art museums and galleries in Sweden
Modern art museums
Buildings and structures in Malmö
Modernist architecture in Sweden
Museums in Skåne County
Tourist attractions in Malmö